The Headon Hill Formation is a geological formation found in the Isle of Wight and south Hampshire, England. It preserves fossils dating back to the Priabonian stage (uppermost Eocene).

See also

 List of fossiliferous stratigraphic units in England

References

 

Geologic formations of England
Paleogene England
Eocene Series of Europe
Priabonian Stage
Geology of Hampshire
Geology of the Isle of Wight